A JavaScript graphics library is a JavaScript library used to aid in the creation of graphics for either the HTML5 canvas element or SVG. Such a library eases the development and display of graphic elements like particles, motion, animation, plotting, and 3D graphics. Most JavaScript graphics libraries also provide easier access to JavaScript events.

Examples
AnyChart
D3.js
Dojo Toolkit (dual BSD and AFL license)
Google Charts
Plotly.js
Raphaël
Three.js
p5.js

See also
Comparison of JavaScript frameworks
List of charting software

External links
Comparison of 2D canvas libraries

JavaScript libraries